Igor Alberto Rinck de Diver Camargo (born 12 May 1983), known as Igor de Camargo, is a Belgian professional footballer who plays as a striker.

He is also a former Belgium international.

Club career

Early career
Born in Porto Feliz, São Paulo, De Camargo moved to Belgium in November 2000, after making his senior debut with local side Estrela Esporte Clube. He joined KRC Genk after impressing on a trial, but was only promoted to the first team in 2001 after spending six months with the B-side.

De Camargo only made his senior debut on 20 October 2001, coming on as a late substitute for Moumouni Dagano in a 4–2 home win against KFC Lommel SK. He scored his first goal for the side the following 12 January, netting his team's fifth in a 6–1 away defeat of KSK Beveren.

After featuring rarely during the 2002–03 season (which included 11 minutes in a 6–0 loss at Real Madrid in the UEFA Champions League), De Camargo was loaned to newly-promoted side K. Beringen-Heusden-Zolder in June 2003 for the coming season.

De Camargo scored ten goals for the side during the campaign; highlights included a brace in a 3–1 home win against RSC Charleroi on 4 April 2004. Upon returning to Genk, he featured sparingly before moving to fellow top tier side FC Molenbeek Brussels Strombeek in January 2005.

Standard Liège
In late January 2006, De Camargo agreed to a contract with Standard Liège, still in the top division. He made his debut for the club on 11 February in a 2–0 away defeat of KSK Beveren, and scored his first goal the following weekend in a 7–1 home win against Cercle Brugge KSV.

De Camargo was a regular starter during the following campaigns, being a key member of the attack as Standard won two league titles in a row. In January 2009, he signed a new contract until June 2013.

On 16 September 2009, De Camargo captained the side in a 3–2 home loss against Arsenal.

Borussia Mönchengladbach
On 22 April 2010, De Camargo announced that he would transfer to Bundesliga club Borussia Mönchengladbach at the end of the season. After struggling with injuries, he made his debut for the club on 2 October, playing the last eight minutes in a 1–1 home draw against VfL Wolfsburg.

De Camargo scored his first goal for Borussa on 6 November 2010, netting his team's third in a 3–3 home draw against FC Bayern Munich; he previously assisted Marco Reus in Borussia's second goal. He suffered a knee injury in the following match which kept him out of the latter stages of the season, but still returned in May. He scored the winner on 19 May in a 1–0 home defeat of VfL Bochum, and also assisted Reus in the equalizer in the 1–1 away draw in the return leg six days later, as his side narrowly avoided relegation through the play-offs.

De Camargo was loaned to fellow top tier club TSG 1899 Hoffenheim on 29 January 2013, until the end of the season. He left the side with one goal in only eight matches, being an unused substitute in both legs of the relegation play-offs.

Back to Standard Liège
On 8 July 2013, De Camargo signed a three-year contract at his former club Standard Liège. A backup to Imoh Ezekiel and Michy Batshuayi during his first season, he managed to score eleven goals in his second.

Back to Genk
On 23 June 2015, KRC Genk signed De Camargo from Standard Liège; he returned to his first professional club on a two-year deal. He played his first match for the side on 25 July, starting and scoring a brace in a 3–1 home win against OH Leuven.

Despite appearing regularly, De Camargo only contributed with seven goals in 33 matches.

APOEL
On 15 July 2016, De Camargo signed a two-year contract with reigning Cypriot champions APOEL FC. He made his competitive debut on 27 July as a 77th-minute substitute in his team's 2–1 away defeat against Rosenborg BK in the third qualifying round of the Champions League.

De Camargo scored his first goal for APOEL on 10 September, netting the third goal in his team's 4–0 away victory against Nea Salamis Famagusta FC in the 2016–17 First Division. Five days later, he scored the winner against FC Astana in the group stage of the 2016–17 UEFA Europa League.

KV Mechelen
 On 1 June 2018 he joined Mechelen on a free transfer. After the end of the 2020–21 season he considered retirement from football.

RWDM
On 18 January 2022, De Camargo signed with RWDM until the end of the 2021–22 season, returning to the club 17 years later (RWDM claims the history of Molenbeek, which has been dissolved since De Camargo played there).

International career
In January 2009, De Camargo received Belgian nationality. he was called up to the Belgium national team and made his debut against Slovenia in February 2009. He appeared in nine matches during his international career with Belgium, but without managing to score.

Career statistics

Club

International

Honours
Genk
Belgian First Division: 2001–02

Standard Liège
Belgian First Division: 2007–08, 2008–09
Belgian Supercup: 2008, 2009

APOEL
Cypriot First Division: 2016–17, 2017–18

Mechelen
Belgian Cup: 2018-19

References

External links
 APOEL official profile
 
 
 
 

 
1983 births
Living people
Footballers from São Paulo (state)
Brazilian emigrants to Belgium
Naturalised citizens of Belgium
Brazilian footballers
Belgian footballers
Association football forwards
Belgian Pro League players
Challenger Pro League players
K.R.C. Genk players
R.W.D.M. Brussels F.C. players
Standard Liège players
Bundesliga players
Borussia Mönchengladbach players
TSG 1899 Hoffenheim players
Cypriot First Division players
APOEL FC players
K.V. Mechelen players
RWDM47 players
Belgium international footballers
Brazilian expatriate footballers
Belgian expatriate footballers
Expatriate footballers in Germany
Expatriate footballers in Cyprus
Brazilian expatriate sportspeople in Germany
Brazilian expatriate sportspeople in Cyprus
Belgian expatriate sportspeople in Germany
Belgian expatriate sportspeople in Cyprus
People from Porto Felix